Mir Khalil-ur-Rahman (1927 – 25 January 1992) was the founder and editor of the Jang Group of Newspapers  which currently publishes many Urdu and English newspapers in Pakistan. A self-made newspaper magnate, he ranks among the most successful newspaper entrepreneurs in Pakistan.

Early life
Mir Khalil ur Rahman was born in 1927 to a Kashmiri business family who migrated from Kashmir Valley due to economic reason to  Gujranwala, Punjab, where he was born. He received his basic schooling from the same place. He matriculated from Fatehpuri Muslim High School in Delhi and received a degree from Daryaganj Commercial College, Delhi.
During the Second World War, his parents moved to New Delhi, the capital of India. It was here that he discovered his love for journalism. The world of newspapers attracted him far more than the dull books of accounting. He had a passion for reading and writing and a fondness for newspapers and magazines. He sat glued to his radio set, listening to the latest war news.

In 1940, when he was still a student, he started and founded a newspaper for the Muslims during World War II in Delhi. He called it the Jang, or War. Some of his critics said, at that time, that he encouraged the war hysteria by selecting a name like that for his newspaper but  Mir Khalil-ur-Rehman made it clear that he was doing it for the soldiers and not to encourage the Second world war.

Career
After the independence of Pakistan on 14 August 1947, Mir Khalil moved to Karachi, first capital of the newly created state of Pakistan, and started publishing the Daily Jang from there which was funded by a loan of 5000 rupees from Abdul Ghani Barq of Ferozsons Publishers of Lahore. Pakistan's first Governor General and founder,  Muhammad Ali Jinnah was delighted by this move and offered the government's help in running it. Mir, however, declined the offer saying that the freedom of the press was his motto and goal for journalism in Pakistan. Mir also helped in the founding of the Council of Pakistan Newspaper Editors. He opposed, tooth and nail, any government measures or action which curbed the freedom of the press in Pakistan.

References

External links
 The News International daily newspaper homepage
 Mir Khalil ur Rehman Foundation official website (Archived)

Pakistani newspaper chain founders
1927 births
1992 deaths
University of the Punjab alumni
Rahman family
Pakistani male journalists
20th-century Pakistani businesspeople
Pakistani philanthropists
People from Gujranwala
20th-century philanthropists
Pakistani people of Kashmiri descent
Indian newspaper founders
Pakistani newspaper founders